Richard John Alexander Talbert (born 26 April 1947) is a British-American contemporary ancient historian and classicist on the faculty of the University of North Carolina at Chapel Hill, where he is William Rand Kenan, Jr., Professor of Ancient History and Classics. Talbert is a leading scholar of ancient geography and the idea of space in the ancient Mediterranean world.

Education
Talbert received his education at The King's School, Canterbury and Corpus Christi College, Cambridge, where he gained Double First Class Honours in Classics (1968), followed by a PhD (1972).

Career
Connected to his spatial research is a major project on the Tabula Peutingeriana (Peutinger table), a copy of an ancient Roman map preserved in a Medieval version once owned by Konrad Peutinger. He is the head of the advisory board of the Ancient World Mapping Center, an interdisciplinary research unit based at the University of North Carolina at Chapel Hill. Talbert is also a senior editor of the Pleiades Project, a joint digital humanities venture focused on ancient world geography coordinated by The University of North Carolina at Chapel Hill and New York University. Cambridge granted him a Litt. D. in 2003. He is also a Corresponding Member of the Deutsches Archäologisches Institut. Talbert has been on the faculties of the Queen's University, Belfast and McMaster University in Ontario, Canada.  He was Herodotus Fellow at the Institute for Advanced Study, Princeton, New Jersey, (1978–79). His study The Senate of Imperial Rome (Princeton University Press, 1984) won the American Philological Association's Goodwin Award of Merit in 1985.

For 2000–01 Talbert was awarded a Guggenheim Fellowship, an American Council of Learned Societies Senior Fellowship, and the inaugural Robert F. and Margaret S. Goheen Fellowship at the National Humanities Center in North Carolina. Talbert has served on the council of the Classical Association of Canada, and was president of the Association of Ancient Historians (1999–2002). He was awarded the American Philological Association's Medal for Distinguished Service in 1999. He was resident professor at the American Academy in Rome (1991), and currently chairs the advisory council to its School of Classical Studies. He taught at the University of Alabama in Huntsville as eminent scholar in the humanities (spring 1993), and has been visiting professor of classics at Princeton University (spring 1997). In 2011/12 he was the Archaeological Institute of America's Martha Sharp Joukowsky Lecturer, and Directeur d'études invité at the Ecole Pratique des Hautes Etudes, Paris. For Fall 2012 Talbert was named the first Suzanne Deal Booth Scholar-in-Residence at the Intercollegiate Center for Classical Studies in Rome, Italy. Talbert has directed a National Endowment for the Humanities Institute on the early Roman empire (Chapel Hill, 1991), and co-directed (with Michael Maas of Rice University) three National Endowment for the Humanities Seminars at the American Academy in Rome (2000, 2006, and 2012.). In 2017 Talbert and Maas directed an NEH summer program focused on "Migration and Empire: The Roman Experience From Marcus Aurelius to Muhammad".

Significant among his scholarly work is the compilation of the Barrington Atlas of the Greek and Roman World, which won the 2000 Association of American Publishers Award for Best Professional/Scholarly Multi-volume Reference Work in the Humanities. He has also completed path-breaking research on the Tabula Peutingeriana, a Medieval manuscript containing a copy of a likely ancient Roman map. Talbert's work, including both print and digital components, analyzes the map in an effort to situate it in terms of Roman world view.

Talbert has continued to explore Roman ideation related to time and space with published work on portable sundials and modes of communication and travel in the Roman Mediterranean world.

Talbert has trained many ancient historians during his tenure at the University of North Carolina.

Selected publications

Monographs
 1971. Studies on Timoleon and the revival of Greek Sicily from 344 to 317 B.C. (PhD dissertation, University of Cambridge. Faculty of Classics)
 1974. Timoleon and the Revival of Greek Sicily (Cambridge).
 1984. The Senate of Imperial Rome (Princeton University Press). . Reviews: American Journal of Philology 108.3 (1987).
 1985. Atlas of Classical History (Routledge). . Japanese-language edition 1996.  Girishia rōma rekishi chizu ギリシア。ローマ歴史地図 / Richiādo·J·A·Tarubāto hen ; Nonaka Natsumi, Oda Kenji yaku./リチァード·J·A·タルバート編 ; 野中夏実, 小田謙爾訳. 
 2010. Rome's World: The Peutinger Map Reconsidered (Cambridge). ; online content. Reviews: BMCR 2012.04.14; TLS; Journal of Roman Archaeology 24.831; Elijah Meeks (2011).
 [Festschrift]. Lee L. Brice and Daniëlle Slootjes. Edd. 2014. Aspects of Ancient Institutions and Geography: Studies in Honor of Richard J.A. Talbert. Leiden: E. J. Brill. . Reviews: Ancient History Bulletin 2015
 2017. Roman portable sundials: the empire in your hand. (Oxford). 
 2023. World and Hour in Roman Minds Exploratory Essays Oxford University Press.

Edited volumes
 2000. Barrington Atlas of the Greek and Roman World (Princeton, 2000). . Reviews: Journal of Roman Archaeology 14.454; Athena Review 2.4 ; JRS 94 (2004): 183–90; additional reviews. 2013 app version.
 2004. with Kai Brodersen. Space in the Roman World, its Perception and Presentation (LIT, Munster). . Reviews: BMCR 2005.09.41
 2004. with M.T. Boatwright and D. Gargola. The Romans: From Village to Empire (Oxford). . Review: BMCR 2006.04.29. Czech edition (2012). Dějiny římské rise: od nejranějších časů po Konstantina Velikého .
 2005. trans. Plutarch on Sparta new ed. .
 2006. with M.T. Boatwright and D. Gargola. A Brief History of the Romans (Oxford). .
 2008. with R.W. Unger Cartography in antiquity and the Middle Ages: fresh perspectives, new methods (Brill). . Reviews: BMCR 2009.06.07.
 2010. with Kurt A. Raaflaub.Geography and Ethnography: Perceptions of the World in Pre-Modern Societies (Wiley-Blackwell). . Reviews: Journal of Roman Archaeology 25.763.
 2011. with David S. Potter. Classical Courts and Courtiers (American Journal of Philology vol. 132.1, special issue).
 2012. with M.T. Boatwright, N. Lenski and D. Gargola The Romans: From Village to Empire: A History of Rome from Earliest Times to the End of the Western Empire 2nd expanded edition (Oxford). .
 2012. with Susan E. Alcock and John P. Bodel. Highways, Byways, and Road Systems in the Pre-Modern World. (Wiley-Blackwell). .
 2012. Ancient Perspectives: Maps and Their Place in Mesopotamia, Egypt, Greece, and Rome. (University of Chicago Press). . Reviews: BMCR 2013.10.63; AJA 117.4 (2013)
 2013. New introduction to re-print of William Smith. An atlas of ancient geography, biblical and classical: maps of the ancient world. London: I. B. Tauris. .
 2013. Boatwright, M. T., D. J. Gargola, N. Lenski, and R. Talbert. A Brief History of the Romans. Second Edition. Oxford University Press. 
 2014. F. S. Naiden and R. Talbert. American Journal of Philology 135.2 (Whole number 538) Special Issue: Moses Finley in America: The Making of an Ancient Historian.
 2017. with Fred Naiden. Mercury's Wings: Exploring Modes of Communication in the Ancient World. Oxford University Press. .
 2018. Challenges of Mapping the Classical World Routledge. 
 2022. with Lindsay Holman and Benet Salway. Atlas of Classical History Revised edition. Routledge 
 Forthcoming (2023). Travel in the Roman Mind (with Grant Parker). Routledge. .

Maps
 2011. ed. Routledge Wall Maps for the Ancient World (7 maps).
 2014. ed. Asia Minor in the Second Century C.E. The map is at 1:750,000 scale, and prints at a size of 80 in x 50 in (at 300 dpi).
 ed. Maps for Texts series.

Internet resources
 2012. "Maps" for Oxford Bibliographies Online: Classics.
 2010. Digital material accompanying Rome's World: The Peutinger Map Reconsidered. Cambridge University Press.

References

External links
 Ancient World Mapping Center
 Faculty profile

English historians
English classical scholars
Historians of antiquity
University of North Carolina at Chapel Hill faculty
Place of birth missing (living people)
1947 births
Living people
Classical scholars of the University of North Carolina at Chapel Hill